Scrobipalpa walsinghami is a moth in the family Gelechiidae. It was described by Povolný in 1971. It is found in Tunisia.

The forewings are nearly uniform graphite grey. The hindwings are whitish.

References

Scrobipalpa
Moths described in 1971